Edward Adelbert Doisy (November 13, 1893 – October 23, 1986) was an American biochemist. He received the Nobel Prize in Physiology or Medicine in 1943 with Henrik Dam for their discovery of vitamin K (K from "Koagulations-Vitamin" in German) and its chemical structure.

Doisy was born in Hume, Illinois, on November 13, 1893. He completed his A.B. degree in 1914 and his M.S. degree in 1916 from the University of Illinois at Urbana-Champaign. He completed his Ph.D. in 1920 from Harvard University.

In 1919 he accepted a faculty appointment in the Department of Biochemistry at Washington University in St. Louis, where he rose in rank to associate professor. In 1923, he moved to St. Louis University as professor and chairman of the new Department of Biochemistry. He served as professor and chairman of that department until he retired in 1965. Saint Louis University renamed the department the E.A. Doisy Department of Biochemistry, in his honor. More recently, the department has again been renamed. It is now known as the E.A. Doisy Department of Biochemistry and Molecular Biology.

In 1940, he was a lecturer in medicine at the University of Chicago School of Medicine.

He also competed with Adolf Butenandt in the discovery of estrone in 1930. They discovered the substance independently, but only Butenandt was awarded the Nobel Prize in Chemistry in 1939.

References

External links

St. Louis University Department of Biochemistry and Molecular Biology

1893 births
1986 deaths
American biochemists
American Nobel laureates
Harvard University alumni
Nobel laureates in Physiology or Medicine
People from Edgar County, Illinois
Saint Louis University faculty
University of Illinois Urbana-Champaign alumni
Washington University in St. Louis faculty
Scientists from Missouri
Nobel laureates affiliated with Missouri
Vitamin researchers
University of Chicago faculty